The 2014/15 FIS Freestyle Skiing World Cup was the thirty sixth World Cup season in freestyle skiing organised by International Ski Federation. The season started on 5 December 2014 and ended on 15 March 2015. This season included five disciplines: moguls, aerials, ski cross, halfpipe and slopestyle.

Men

Ski Cross

Moguls

Aerials

Halfpipe

Slopestyle

Ladies

Ski Cross

Moguls

Aerials

Halfpipe

Slopestyle

Team

Mixed

Men's standings

Overall 

Standings after 32 events.

Moguls 

Standings after 9 races.

Aerials 

Standings after 7 races.

Ski Cross 

Standings after 11 races.

Halfpipe 

Standings after 3 races.

Slopestyle 

Standings after 2 races.

Ladies' standings

Overall 

Standings after 32 events.

Moguls 

Standings after 9 races.

Aerials 

Standings after 7 races.

Ski Cross 

Standings after 11 races.

Halfpipe 

Standings after 3 races.

Slopestyle 

Standings after 2 races.

Nations Cup

Overall 

Standings after 64 events.

Men 

Standings after 32 events.

Ladies 

Standings after 32 events.

Footnotes

References

FIS Freestyle Skiing World Cup
World Cup
World Cup